Instant Karma is an Indian band formed by Ehsaan Noorani, Loy Mendonsa and Farhad Wadia most popular for its albums Dance Masti and its sequels. According to them, they do "versions, not remixes"

History
Instant Karma was formed after Bally Sagoo came out with his album of versions Bollywood Flashback in mid 1990s. Ehsaan and Loy thought of starting a band to do something comparable, if not better. They just did a couple songs one of them being Dil Kya Kare and forgot about them. Then Sony Music marketed Dil Kya Kare and it was a huge hit. After that Ehsaan, Loy and Farhad started with Instant Karma and compiling albums regularly.

Instant Karma employed many talented voices such as Shankar Mahadevan, Shaan, Sagarika, Zubeen Garg, Mahalakshmi Iyer etc.

The first two albums in the Dance Masti collection have sold about 700,000 copies.

Discography
Dance Masti (1996)

Return of Dance Masti (1999)

Dance Masti... Again (2002)

Dance Masti Forever (2006)

Best of Dance Masti (3 CD Compilation)

Notes

Indian musical groups
Musical groups established in 1996
Musical groups disestablished in 2006